Aʿazzu Mā Yuṭlab, also known as al-ʿAqīda, is a 12th-century book containing the teachings of Ibn Tumart, self-proclaimed Mehdi and founder of the Almohad movement. According to the text of the book itself, it was compiled by a scribe to whom Abd al-Mu'min dictated his notes from Ibn Tumart's teachings.

Content 
Aʿazzu Mā Yuṭlab contains a variety of topics, commentaries, summaries, and essays representing the foundation Ibn Tumart's movement. It deals with hadith, fiqh, usūl ad-din, tawhid, politics, jihad, calls for reform, and promoting beneficence and discouraging maleficence.

At the basis of Ibn Tumart's message and teachings is the concept of "tawhid," from which the Almohads got their name: al-muwaḥḥidūn.

Editions 

al-ʿAqīda was translated into Latin by the deacon Mark of Toledo in 606/1209–10, after Almohad military successes in al-Andalus, especially the Battle of Alarcos.

The Hungarian Orientalist Ignác Goldziher studied the book and published an introduction to an edition published in occupied Algeria in 1903.

The original text is preserved in two manuscript copies, dated 579/1183 and 595/1199.

References 

Literature of the Almohad Caliphate
Islamic manuscripts
Manifestos
12th-century Arabic books